The 1998 German Figure Skating Championships took place on December 12–14, 1997 in Berlin. Skaters competed in the disciplines of men's singles, ladies' singles, pair skating, ice dancing, and precision skating.

Results

Men

Ladies

Pairs

Ice dancing

Precision skating

External links
 1998 German Championships results

German Figure Skating Championships, 1998
German Figure Skating Championships